Unleash the Carnivore is the third studio album by American death metal band Devourment. It was released through Brutal Bands on June 26, 2009.

Track listing

Personnel
Devourment
 Mike Majewski – vocals
 Ruben Rosas – guitars
 Chris Andrews – bass
 Eric Park – drums

Production
D. Braxton Henry – producer
Pär Olofsson – artwork
Dan Seagrave – artwork (serpent)

References

Devourment albums
2009 albums
Albums with cover art by Pär Olofsson
Albums with cover art by Dan Seagrave